Federal Highway 261 (Carretera Federal 261) is a Federal Highway of Mexico. It connects Campeche City with Umán in Yucatán and Mérida with Progreso; it also serves as a bypass of the latter city.

References

261